The Wonju Byeon clan is a Korean clan. Its Bon-gwan is in Wonju, Gangwon Province (historical).  According to research in 2015, the clan had 47,804 members.  Clan members live on both the Korean Peninsula and in the United States, and their surnames are variously Romanized as Byun, Pyon, and Pyun.  The founder of the clan was Byeon An-ryeol (Korean: 변안렬, Hanja: 邊安烈, Hanyu Pinyin: Biān Ānliè, 1334-1390), a renowned military general during the late Goryeo Dynasty.

Clan founder 

Byeon An-ryeol was born in April 1334 in Shenyang in present-day China’s Liaoning Province.  His ancestor, Byeon Yo (Korean: 변요, Hanja: 邊幺), was a naturalized resident of Hwangju County in present-day North Korea’s North Hwanghae Province during the Song Dynasty in China.  Byeon An-ryeol’s grandfather, Byeon Sun (Korean: 변순, Hanja: 邊順), returned to China in 1268 to be appointed by the Yuan Dynasty as a high official of 1,000 households (Chinese: 千户侯) in Shenyang.  Byeon Sun was a great-great-grandchild of Byeon Ryeo (Korean: 변려, Hanja: 邊呂), and Byeon Ryeo was a son of Byeon Yo.

In 1352, Byeon An-ryeol entered Goryeo by accompanying Queen Noguk, an ethnic Mongol princess that became queen of Goryeo by marriage to Goryeo King Gongmin, as her fatherly master. Because of his exploits during a punitive military expedition he carried out in Jeju Island along with fellow Goryeo general Choe Yeong, he was commended during the reign of King U of Goryeo.  In 1361, Byeon led his forces in routing the anti-Yuan Red Turban rebels on the battlefield and was promoted for his accomplishments.  In 1374, he joined fellow Goryeo general Yi Seong-gye in successfully repulsing Japanese pirates and was rewarded with a prestigious title.

On January 16, 1390, Byeon was executed after the Goryeo bureaucrat and politician Kim Jeo implicated him in an unclear confession in a plot to restore King U to the throne after he was deposed by Yi.  His family members were pardoned.  Yi ascended to the throne in 1392 and established the Joseon Dynasty.

The Tomb of Daeeun Byeon An-ryeol is located in the town of Jingeon in Namyangju, Gyeonggi Province, South Korea.  On September 2, 2002, the tomb was designated Gyeonggi Province Cultural Material No. 116.

Byeon was portrayed by South Korean actor Song Geum-sik in the 2014 South Korean television series Jeong Dojeon.

Other prominent members 

Another prominent clan member was Pyon Su (Korean: 변수, Hanja: 邊燧, also known as Penn Su, 1861-1891), a Korean diplomat that in 1891 became the first Korean student ever to receive a degree from an American institution.  Pyon received a degree from the Maryland Agricultural College (MAC), now known as the University of Maryland.  Pyon was part of the first Korean diplomatic delegation to the U.S., the Bobingsa (Korean: 보빙사, Hanja: 報聘使), which was dispatched by Joseon King Gojong in July 1883 to study the West’s industrialization and modernization processes.  The delegation met with then U.S. President Chester A. Arthur.  Pyon eventually became involved in the radical reformist political movements of late-19th-century Korea and played a role in fomenting the failed Gapsin Coup of 1884.  Pyon fled Korea and ultimately migrated to Japan and the U.S., where he obtained his degree and briefly worked for the U.S. Department of Agriculture.  He possessed Chinese, Japanese, and English language capabilities.

Pyon died in 1891 after he was struck by a train.  He is buried in Beltsville, Maryland.

On December 21, 2020, the University of Maryland announced that it would name a new residence hall the “Pyon-Chen Hall” in honor of Pyon and Chunjen Constant Chen, who in 1915 became the first Chinese student to enroll at MAC.

See also 
 Korean clan names of foreign origin

References

Biographic material 

 Goryeosa (Korean: 고려사, Hanja: 高麗史), Volume 126 (contains a biography of Byeon An-ryeol)

External links 
 

 
Korean clan names of Chinese origin
Byeon clans